The Manassas Water Tower is a historic water storage facility at 9000 Quarry Street in Manassas, Virginia. It is a steel structure  in height, and is typical in style for its 1914 construction date, with a steel trestle supporting a tank with a hemispherical base and conical roof. It was built near one of the city's six water wells, and is one of six water towers in the state with a hemispherical bottom. It is also the oldest water tower in the region.

It was added to the National Register of Historic Places in 2016.

See also
National Register of Historic Places listings in Manassas, Virginia

References

Infrastructure completed in 1914
Buildings and structures in Manassas, Virginia
National Register of Historic Places in Manassas, Virginia
Water towers in Virginia
Towers completed in 1914
Water towers on the National Register of Historic Places